Rize of the Fenix Tour was a worldwide concert tour by American rock band Tenacious D. The tour was in support of the band's 2012 album Rize of the Fenix, with the tour visiting North America and Europe. The tour began on May 23, 2012 and ended on October 24, 2012, featuring 45 shows in total. The full show performed at Rock am Ring and highlights from the performance at Rock im Park were broadcast live on German TV. Highlights from the Download Festival performance were broadcast in the UK on the Sky Arts channel. These broadcasts have since been uploaded to the Internet unofficially by YouTube users. This was the band's second major concert tour, following The Pick of Destiny Tour, which toured from late 2006 to early 2007.

In late 2015, the band auctioned the signature 'Fenix' inflatable and backdrop amongst various props and costumes to raise funds for the November 2015 Paris attacks.

Average set list
"Rize of the Fenix"
"Low Hangin' Fruit
"Señorita" 
"Deth Starr"
"Roadie"
"Throw Down"
"Sax-a-Boom"
"Kielbasa"
"Kickapoo"
"Dude (I Totally Miss You)"
"Kyle Quit the Band"
"Friendship"
"The Metal"
"Wonderboy"
"Beelzeboss (The Final Showdown)"
"Pinball Wizard" / "There's a Doctor" / "Go to the Mirror!" (The Who medley)
"Tribute"
"Double Team"
Encore
"Baby" 
"Fuck Her Gently"

Internet Archive albums

There is one album which was released with the explicit permission of Tenacious D. This live show has been recorded and released through Internet Archive and is available for free digital download.

Tour dates

Personnel

Jack Black – lead vocals, rhythm acoustic guitar
Kyle Gass – lead acoustic guitar, backing vocals
John Konesky – electric guitar, backing vocals
John Spiker – bass, backing vocals
Brooks Wackerman - drums

Incidents

During the Las Vegas performance on July 28, 2012, a brawl involving a dozen or so people broke out in the crowd by the stage. A few people were pulled out and the show continued. During the incident, there was a stabbing. Police were called to the scene as it was reported by a steward. By the time the police had arrived, Tenacious D had just finished "Friendship" which was the fourteenth song out of the planned twenty-three songs. The duo quickly played "Tribute" before the venue was cleared out. The man who was stabbed recovered.

References

See also 

Rize of the Fenix (album)

2012 concert tours
Tenacious D concert tours